Lesbian, gay, bisexual, and transgender (LGBT) people in  East Timor face legal challenges not experienced by non-LGBT residents. Both male and female same-sex sexual activity are legal in East Timor, but same-sex couples and households headed by same-sex couples are not eligible for the same legal protections available to opposite-sex married couples.

East Timor and the Philippines are considered as leaders on human rights in Southeast Asia, including LGBT rights, although no legal protections for LGBT citizens have been enacted into law yet. In 2011, the country signed the "joint statement on ending acts of violence and related human rights violations based on sexual orientation and gender identity" at the United Nations, condemning violence and discrimination against LGBT people. In July 2017, just 15 years after independence, the nation's first ever pride march was conducted with the support of the Timorese Government. Among the participants of the pride march were LGBT citizens, nuns, religious ministers, tribal folks, students, and government officials. The event has been held annually ever since.

Law regarding same-sex sexual activity
Same-sex sexual activity has been legal since 1975. The age of consent is 14 regardless of sexual orientation or gender.

Recognition of same-sex relationships
There is no legal recognition of same-sex unions in East Timor.

Discrimination protections
There is no legal protection based on sexual orientation or gender identity. There was a clause against discrimination based on sexual orientation included in the original draft of the Timorese Constitution but it was voted out by 52 out of 88 MPs before the Constitution took effect in 2002.

However, since 2009, bias on the basis of sexual orientation has been considered to be an aggravating circumstance in the case of crimes (alongside ethnicity, gender, religion, disability, etc.).

In April 2019, the Timorese Minister of Legislative Reform and Parliamentary Affairs called for an end to discrimination against LGBT people saying, "Barbaric laws and discriminatory treatment of marginalized groups have to end". Moreover, in response to allegations made in the National Parliament by two MPs, he announced that he would request an official inquiry into allegations of ill-treatment of disabled and LGBT patients at the national hospital in Dili.

Living conditions
The Roman Catholic Church has a strong influence in the country and was the main opponent to the constitutional clause to protect LGBT people from discrimination. In 2002, when the clause was discussed in Parliament, a prominent Christian politician argued there weren't any gay people in Timor-Leste and called homosexuality a "disease". However, in recent years, many LGBT individuals have also found support within the Catholic Church. While the Church has not taken an official stance in support of LGBT rights, many congregations have got involved to support the community. A Catholic nun volunteered to officiate the 2017 Pride parade with a prayer.

Discrimination and violence from family members and the broader society continue to affect LGBT people. A 2017 survey of 57 young lesbian and bisexual women as well as transgender men co-authored by activist Bella Galhos found that 86% of the respondents had experienced both physical and psychological violence, including domestic violence, forced marriages and attempts by family members to change their sexual orientation or gender identity.

Advocacy and activism

LGBT advocacy groups in East Timor include: Hatutan, CODIVA (Coalition on Diversity and Action), and Arco Iris.

On 29 June 2017, the first pride parade in East Timor took place in the capital city of Dili with reportedly 500 people in attendance. A Catholic nun spoke at the beginning of the event. The same week, Prime Minister Rui Maria de Araújo declared that "discrimination, disrespect and abuse towards people because of their sexual orientation or gender identity does not provide any benefit to our nation" and that "every person has the potential to contribute to the development of our nation, including the LGBTQ community", thus becoming the first Southeast Asian leader to publicly support LGBT rights.

Activists continue to speak about violence against LGBT people on a regular basis. In April 2018, the Timorese LGBT organization Hatutan launched a documentary on acceptance of LGBT people within their families, entitled  in Tetum (The Road to Acceptance). The launch was attended by former President and former Prime Minister Xanana Gusmão and representatives of several embassies and organizations.

The second pride parade was held on 20 July 2018 in Dili. About 1,500 people participated, three times that of the previous year. The event began with a screening of the aforementioned documentary "Dalan ba Simu Malu", and followed with a march led by a local band who played traditional Timorese resistance songs.

The third pride parade was held on 12 July 2019 in Dili. About 3,000 people participated, double of that of the previous year, and six times the number of people who took part in the first such event in 2017. Minister of Social Solidarity and Inclusion Armanda Berta dos Santos supported the event. President Francisco Guterres released a statement in support of the event, writing "I am a President for all people! I respect everyone! Respect and love tie us as family, as community, as a people. I ask everyone to see diversity as our nation's wealth. Together we strengthen collective power and knowledge. Together we fight for a society which is more just. Together we build a Nation which is full with respect and love to all."
Current president supports basic LGBT rights like same-sex civil marriage

Human rights reports

2017 United States Department of State report
In 2017, the United States Department of State reported the following, concerning the status of LGBT rights in East Timor:

Acts of Violence, Discrimination, and Other Abuses Based on Sexual Orientation and Gender Identity"The constitution and law are silent on same-sex relations and other matters of sexual orientation and gender identity. The PDHJ [Office of the Provedor for Human Rights and Justice] worked with civil society organization CODIVA (Coalition on Diversity and Action) to increase awareness in the lesbian, gay, bisexual, transgender, and intersex (LGBTI) community regarding processes available for human rights complaints. While physical abuse in public or by public authorities was uncommon, LGBTI persons were often verbally abused and discriminated against in some public services, including medical centers. CODIVA noted that transgender members of the community were particularly vulnerable to harassment and discrimination. A November study conducted for Rede Feto, a national women’s advocacy network, with lesbian and bisexual women and transgender men in Dili and Bobonaro documented the use by family members of corrective rape, physical and psychological abuse, ostracism, discrimination, and marginalization against LGBTI individuals. Access to education was limited for some LGBTI persons who were removed from the family home or who feared abuse at school. Transgender students were more likely to experience bullying and drop out of school at the secondary level. In June members of civil society organized Timor-Leste’s first-ever Pride March in Dili. The march included participation from students, activists, and a representative of the Prime Minister’s Office. Then prime minister Araujo met with LGBTI organizations and called for acceptance of LGBTI individuals on his official Facebook and Twitter accounts."
Discrimination with Respect to Employment and Occupation"There is no specific protection against discrimination based on sexual orientation."

Summary table

See also

Human rights in East Timor
LGBT rights in Asia

References

External links
 
 
 

Human rights in East Timor
East Timor
Gender in East Timor
Law of East Timor